Forte da Salga is a fort in the Azores. It is located in Angra do Heroísmo, on the island of Terceira.

 

Fort Salga
Salga